Wilson College is a private, Presbyterian-related college in Chambersburg, Pennsylvania.  Founded in 1869 by two Presbyterian ministers, it was named for its first major donor, Sarah Wilson of nearby St. Thomas Township, Pennsylvania, who gave $30,000 toward the purchase of the land and home of Alexander McClure.

For 144 years, Wilson operated as a women's college. In 2013 the college's board of trustees voted to make the college coeducational beginning in the 2013–2014 academic year, with male residential students beginning in fall 2014.

History

1869–1900
The college was founded by the Rev. Tryon Edwards and the Rev. James W. Wightman, pastors of Presbyterian churches in nearby Hagerstown, Maryland, and Greencastle, Pennsylvania. The original charter was granted by the Pennsylvania Legislature on March 24, 1869. First named Wilson Female College, it took its present name in 1920. Wilson was one of the first colleges in the U.S. to accept only female students. Its 1870 promotional materials stated that the college was a place for women "to be leaders, not followers, in society". Instruction began in 1870, with the first academic degree awarded in 1874.

The college was modeled after Vassar College. It was named for Sarah Wilson (1795–1871), whose donations were used to purchase the campus land.

1900–2000
Anna Jane McKeag was inaugurated as Wilson's first woman president in 1911, and served until 1915 when she was succeeded by Ethelbert Dudley Warfield.

In 1967 the Wilson College sailing team won the first Intercollegiate Sailing Association national championship held in a women's event (dinghy).

In the 1970s, two tropical storms, Agnes in 1972 and Eloise in 1975, caused flood damage to low-lying buildings on campus.

Although it nearly closed its doors in 1979, a lawsuit organized by students, faculty, parents and an alumnae association succeeded in allowing the college to remain open, making it one of the few colleges to survive a scheduled closing. It subsequently adopted the Phoenix as its mascot, to symbolize the college's survival.

In 1982, Wilson began offering a continuing studies program (now known as the Adult Degree Program) to meet the needs of adults seeking post-secondary education. In 1996, the college was one of the first in the nation to offer an on-campus residential educational experience for single mothers with children.

2000–present
Beginning in summer 2006, Wilson offered its first graduate-degree program, a Master of Arts in Teaching (MAT) for certified elementary school teachers. The college currently offers six graduate degree programs.

The first men to attend Wilson entered at the end of World War II when an influx of male students created shortages at co-educational and men's colleges. These men attended classes for one year before transferring to other colleges.  Men later became eligible to earn degrees from Wilson through the Adult Degree Program, although the traditional undergraduate college remained a College For Women. In January 2013, the college's board of trustees voted to extend coeducation across all programs; male commuter students were admitted in fall 2013, with the first male residential students beginning in fall 2014.

Campus

The Wilson College campus is located at the edge of Chambersburg, Pennsylvania, on both sides of the Conococheague Creek.  The property was originally bought from Alexander McClure, whose home Norland, had been burnt in 1864 by Confederates under the orders of General Jubal Early.  The home was rebuilt before being sold to the college.

Academics

The college offers 34 undergraduate majors, 40 undergraduate minors, and master's degrees. The most popular majors are in the fields of agriculture and agricultural sciences, animal-assisted therapy, biological sciences, nursing, and veterinary/animal health.

Athletics
Wilson athletic teams are the Phoenix. The college is a member of the Division III level of the National Collegiate Athletic Association (NCAA), primarily competing in the Colonial States Athletic Conference (CSAC) since the 2018–19 academic year. The Phoenix previously competed in the United East Conference (UEC;  formerly known as the North Eastern Athletic Conference (NEAC) until after the 2020–21 academic year) from 2007–08 to 2017–18.

Wilson competes in 11 intercollegiate varsity sports: Men's sports include baseball, basketball, golf, soccer and volleyball; while women's sports include basketball, field hockey, lacrosse, soccer, softball and volleyball. Club sports include archery, equestrian and pep talk. The women's equestrian team competes in numerous IHSA and other events.

Wilson began sponsoring men's sports since the 2014–15 academic year when the college became coeducational; starting with basketball and golf, followed by soccer, volleyball and baseball in the following years.

Notable alumnae
 Betty Andujar, Texas politician
 Emily Bacon (1891–1972), physician
 Elisabeth Ann Hudnut Clarkson (class of 1947) (1925-2020), author, Wilson College board chair   
 Pauline Morrow Austin, meteorologist
 Pauline Donnan (1885–1934), opera singer
 Martha Gandy Fales (1930–2006), art historian and curator
 Amy Gilbert (1895–1980), historian
 Zack Hanle, cooking author and journalist
 Katherine Laich (1910–1992), librarian
 Kate Hevner Mueller (1898–1984), psychologist and educator
 Irene Neal, painter
 Mary Lawson Neff (1862–1945), neurologist
 Hannah J. Patterson (1879–1937), suffragist
 Bonnie Lineweaver Paul, attorney and politician
 Joan Risch, homemaker who went missing from her home in the Boston suburbs in 1961
 Sally Hoyt Spofford (1914–2002), ornithologist
 Elizabeth Schofield (1935–2005), archaeologist and classical scholar
 Rosedith Sitgreaves (1915–1992), statistician and professor
 Delia Velculescu, economist
 Frances Wick (1875–1941), physicist

References

External links

 Wilson College
 Wilson College Athletics

 
Second Empire architecture in Pennsylvania
Colonial Revival architecture in Pennsylvania
Gothic Revival architecture in Pennsylvania
Former women's universities and colleges in the United States
Liberal arts colleges in Pennsylvania
Educational institutions established in 1869
School buildings on the National Register of Historic Places in Pennsylvania
Chambersburg, Pennsylvania
Universities and colleges in Franklin County, Pennsylvania
1869 establishments in Pennsylvania
Historic districts on the National Register of Historic Places in Pennsylvania
National Register of Historic Places in Franklin County, Pennsylvania
Universities and colleges affiliated with the Presbyterian Church (USA)
Private universities and colleges in Pennsylvania